Michael Webb may refer to:
 Mike Webb (pastor) (born 1956), Australian musician and church pastor
 Mike Webb (radio host) (1955–2007), American radio personality murdered in 2007
 Mike Webb (rugby union) (born 1979), Canadian rugby union player
 Michael Webb (architect) (born 1937), founding member of Archigram
 Mickey Webb, fictional character in The Bill
 Mojo Webb, musician